Sterling Weatherford (born January 26, 1999) is an American football linebacker for the Chicago Bears of the National Football League (NFL). He was signed by the Indianapolis Colts as an undrafted free agent in 2022 after playing college football at Miami (OH).

College career
Weatherford was a two-star prospect coming out of Hamilton Heights and committed to the Miami RedHawks on August 2, 2016. In his freshman season, he was named Defensive Scout Team Player of the Year, before playing in twelve games as a sophomore, starting one. In a game against Army, Weatherford recorded a career-high nine tackles. In 2019, he finished second on the team with ninety-eight tackles, helping Miami defeat Central Michigan for the MAC Championship. In 2021, he was named All-MAC 2nd Team Defense after recording sixty-six tackles, two interceptions, and a sack.

Professional career

Indianapolis Colts
Weatherford signed with the Indianapolis Colts as an undrafted free agent following the 2022 NFL Draft on April 30, 2022. In his first preseason game, Weatherford recorded an interception of Buffalo Bills quarterback Matt Barkley. He was waived during final roster cuts on August 30.

Chicago Bears
On August 31, Weatherford was claimed by the Chicago Bears and signed to their active roster. Colts GM Chris Ballard was reportedly "upset" that the Bears claimed Weatherford, hoping to re-sign him to the team's practice squad.

References

External links
 Chicago Bears bio
 Miami RedHawks bio

1999 births
Living people
American football linebackers
Players of American football from Indiana
Miami RedHawks football players
Chicago Bears players